Dorel Cristudor (born 11 April 1954) is a former Romanian sprinter turned bobsledder. He competed in the four man event at the 1980 Winter Olympics.

References

1954 births
Living people
Romanian male bobsledders
Romanian male sprinters
Olympic bobsledders of Romania
Bobsledders at the 1980 Winter Olympics
Place of birth missing (living people)